Lorton is a civil parish in the Borough of Allerdale in Cumbria, England.  It contains 26 listed buildings that are recorded in the National Heritage List for England.  All the listed buildings are designated at Grade II, the lowest of the three grades, which is applied to "buildings of national importance and special interest".  The parish contains the villages of High Lorton and Low Lorton, and is otherwise rural,  Most of the listed buildings are houses and associated structures, or farmhouses and farm buildings.  The other listed buildings include a bridge and a church.


Buildings

References

Citations

Sources

Lists of listed buildings in Cumbria